The 2006 Chandler, Arizona mayoral election was held on March 14, 2006, to elect the mayor of Chandler, Arizona. It saw the reelection of Boyd Dunn.

Results

References 

2006
Chandler
Chandler